Yves Guéna (6 July 1922 – 3 March 2016) was a French politician. In 1940, he joined the Free French Forces in the United Kingdom. He received several decorations for his courage.

Political life 
He belonged to various right wing parties: Union pour la nouvelle République (1962–1968), the Union of Democrats for the Republic (1968–1978) and the Rally for the Republic (1978–1997).

He occupied several posts as minister. In 1968, he was Minister of Information. He was a member of the Parliament between 1962 and 1981 and then again between 1986 and 1988. He was a senator between 1989 and 1997.

In 2000, Guéna was named president of the Constitutional Council of France. In 2004 he left to become president of the Arab World Institute until 2007.

References 

1922 births
2016 deaths
Politicians  from Brest, France
Democratic Union of Labour politicians
Union of Democrats for the Republic politicians
Rally for the Republic politicians
Ministers of Information of France
Transport ministers of France
French Ministers of Commerce and Industry
French Ministers of Posts, Telegraphs, and Telephones
Deputies of the 2nd National Assembly of the French Fifth Republic
Deputies of the 3rd National Assembly of the French Fifth Republic
Deputies of the 4th National Assembly of the French Fifth Republic
Deputies of the 5th National Assembly of the French Fifth Republic
Deputies of the 6th National Assembly of the French Fifth Republic
Deputies of the 8th National Assembly of the French Fifth Republic
French Senators of the Fifth Republic
Senators of Dordogne
Colonial heads of Ivory Coast
French military personnel of World War II
Grand Croix of the Légion d'honneur
Mayors of places in Nouvelle-Aquitaine
Members of the Conseil d'État (France)
École nationale d'administration alumni
French expatriates in the United Kingdom